JQS may refer to

 Journal of Quaternary Science
 Journal of Qur'anic Studies
 Java Quick Starter, a component of the Java software platform